Ozon may refer to:

 Ozon (company), Russian e-commerce company

Places 
Ozon, Ardèche, a commune in the department of Ardèche, France
Ozon, Hautes-Pyrénées, a commune in the department of Hautes-Pyrénées, France

People 
François Ozon, a French film director and screenwriter
Titus Ozon a  Romanian soccer player of the second half of 20th century

Other 
Ozon Radio (disambiguation), various radio stations
Obóz Zjednoczenia Narodowego, a Polish political party

See also 
Ozone